Errorzone (stylized in all lowercase) is the debut studio album by American hardcore punk band Vein, which was released on June 22, 2018, through Closed Casket Activities. Noted by critics for taking influence from nu metal, mathcore, and screamo, the album has gained praise for its genre-bending style. To promote the record, music videos were produced for the tracks "Virus://Vibrance" and "Demise Automation". The album peaked at number 21 on the hard rock Billboard chart within its first week of release.

Demo versions of the tracks "Old Data in a Dead Machine", "Quitting Infinity", and "Untitled" were previously released as a free download on the group's bandcamp page, but these were taken down as they were reworked for this record. The demos would later be included on the band's 2020 compilation album Old Data In A Dead Machine Vol. 1.

Release
The band released the lead single from the album, "Virus://Vibrance" on 8 May 2018 and announced that the album would be out later that year via Closed Casket Activities On 24 May 2018, the band released the single "Demise Automation." The album's final single, "Doomtech" was released on 5 June 2018. On 22 June 2018, the album was released via Closed Casket Activities.

Reception
In both their early and finalized lists, Revolver named the album as among the best releases of 2018. Similarly, David Anthony and Alex McLevy named it as one of the best punk and hardcore albums of the year in an article written for The A.V. Club. Rolling Stone named it the sixth best metal album of 2018 in a year-end list. Writing for Exclaim!, Connor Atkinson describes the record as "an impressive and unique offering of screamo and 90s metalcore anguish" that "briefly loses sight of [Vein's] end-game about halfway through." The album would later be named Exclaim's Best Metal and Hardcore Album of 2018.

Among other publications, Pitchfork writer Andy O'Conner pointed out the band's inclusions of stylistic elements associated with nu-metal and hardcore punk bands from the 1990s, describing it as "retro-futuristic". Errorzone has been described as nu metal, mathcore, metalcore, hardcore, and screamo.

Track listing

Notes
 Track names are stylized in all lowercase.

Personnel
Vein
Anthony DiDio – vocals
Matt Wood – drums
Jeremy Martin – guitar
Josh Butts – guitar
Jon Lhaubouet – bass

Production
Will Putney – engineering, mixing, mastering

References

External links
Errorzone on Bandcamp
Errorzone on Discogs

2018 debut albums
Vein (band) albums
Albums produced by Will Putney